Adeliza Basset (née de Dunstanville, died in or after 1210) was an English noblewoman. She was the daughter of Alan Dunstanville. She married Thomas Basset of Hedendon and their children were Gilbert, Thomas and Alan and Alice who married William Malet.

References 

13th-century English people
13th-century English women